Sulaimon Alao Adekunle popularly known by his stage name Ks1 Malaika is a Nigerian Fuji musician who started playing and performing music from an early age in a quranic school in the suburb of Lagos known as Agege and further paying his dues through Were (the early morning Islamic wake up music during the Ramadan season) before forming his first Fuji band in 1983 who also malaika Wasiu who

Early life and background
Sulaimon Alao Adekunle was born 15 February 1973. With his bandTekoye Fuji Organization, he performed in the United States of America from November 1997 and had a great time as he thrilled in about 15 states before returning to Nigeria with multi-million naira musical equipment. Since then he had taken his trade across the world ensuring that the genre called Fuji is well known.

Music career
KS1 Malaika has performed and duet with various artistes in different genres of music. He is quite friendly with musicians in the Islamic gospel genre and has been featured in their works severally. His music has also been sampled by different artistes in the Fuji and hip hop scene and are hits among music lovers. Malaika composes, arranges and produces his music. Blessed with a wide range of vocal abilities, his music uses traditional African and Nigerian instruments such as the Gangan, Iya ilu, Bata, Sakara, Agogo, assorted percussions, Guitar, Hawaiian guitar, Keyboard and Saxophone With a unique call and respond style that everyone has now adopted, Malaika's music is melodious and easy to dance to. Malaika's constant worldwide travels have endeared him to audiences outside the shores of Nigeria With numerous awards from organisations and music fans across the world, Malaika is striving daily to improve his craft and develop as a better musician and not just a singer.

Endorsement
 Tecno Mobile
 Amador Suites
 Sherfex Oil and Gas
 T-Pumpy Concepts Ltd
 Jamacus Water

Discography

Albums
Mr Wonder (1994) 
Masterpiece (1995)
Legend (1996)
Malaika (1997)
American Dream (1998)
Correction (1999)
Recompense (2000)
CNN (2001)
Unstoppable (2002)
Interlink (2003)
Peace Maker (2004)
Alayeluwa (2005)
European Knockout (2006)
Dedication (2007)
Appreciation (2007)
Elevator and Motivator (2009)
Africa Like Europe (2010)Proper Music (2011)Special day   (2012)Superstar (2014)Original (2016)Golden Jubilee (2017)Example (2019)Original (2020)Golden Jubilee (2020)Password (2022)
The list above is incomplete. You can help expand it.

Joint AlbumsUnityGbeborun (Remi Aluko and Tope Nautical)My MotherDouble MalaikaFuji Gyration (Wasiu Alabi Pasuma, Saidi Balogun, Adx Artquake & Father U Turn)5 & 6 (Muri Alabi Thunder)Shine Shine BoboAppreciation (Wasiu Alabi Pasuma, Yisa Alabi Mirinda)Unification (Wale Ayinde Tekoma & Wasiu Alabi Pasuma)3 Pillars (Wasiu Alabi Pasuma & See Wonder (Yisa Alabi Mirinda)Yara RebeteFuji Lawa (Akano Larondo)Online (Takbir''(Bolaji Bello and Co)

You can help expand the list

Singles
 Boshenjo (featuring Olamide and Tiyewanna)
 Stop the violence (featuring Oritshefemi, Dude Tetsola and Cashson)
 Nana Dance (featuring Dammy Krane)
 IRE
 Celebrate

Other albums
 Iya Mi (Rukayat Gawat, Kifayat Singerr, Sofiat Iya n kaola, Mujidat Damilola, Misturah Aderounmu) 
 Ogbon ati Ete (Southy Arewa and Ajike Arewa)
 Malaika at 44
 Mimo (Rukayat Gawat, Kifayat Singer, Misturah Aderounmu, Aponle Anobi Alh Basit)

MOVIES

He has also produced a movie that is in post production stage titled

ALAO OJE

Awards and nominations

References 

Living people
Yoruba musicians
1973 births